"Run to the Father" is a song by American Contemporary Christian musician and worship leader Cody Carnes. The song was released on July 26, 2019, as the third single from his second studio album, Run to the Father (2020). Carnes co-wrote the song with Matt Maher and Ran Jackson. David Leonard produced the single.

"Run to the Father" peaked at No. 23 on the US Hot Christian Songs chart.

Background
"Run to the Father" was Cody Carnes' third single of 2019, following the release of "Nothing Else" and "Heaven Fall". Carnes shared the story behind the song with FreeCCM.

Composition

Critical reception
Jonathan Andre of 365 Days of Inspiring Media gave a positive review of the song, saying "Thematically and stylistically, the song is quite possibly one of his most mellow, as we contemplate the words sung by Cody about running to the father as we are." Lins Honeyman, in a favourable review at Cross Rhythms, said "this is a stirring piece which ticks all the modern worship boxes from the mid-tempo setting to the self-examining and emotional lyrics - all of which benefit from Carnes' skilled and impassioned vocal delivery."

Commercial performance
"Run to the Father" debuted at No. 36 on the US Hot Christian Songs chart dated August 10, 2019, concurrently charting at No. 14 on the Christian Digital Song Sales chart. The song went on to peak at No. 23 on the Hot Christian Songs chart.

Music videos
The lyric video of "Run to the Father" was published on July 26, 2019, on Cody Carnes' YouTube channel. The live music video of the song, performed by Cody Carnes, recorded at Motion Conference, was published on August 30, 2019, on Cody Carnes' YouTube channel.

Track listing

Credits
Single credits adapted from Tidal.
 Cody Carnes — primary artist
 Jeremy SH Griffith — mixing
 Drew Lavyne — mastering engineer
 David Leonard — producer

EP credits adapted from Tidal.

 Jesse Brock — mixing assistant 
 Cody Carnes — primary artist , producer 
 Max Corwin — mastering engineer 
 The Creak Music — producer 
 Alex Dobbert — mastering engineer 
 Jeremy Edwardson — mixing 
 Jeremy SH Griffith — mixing 
 David Leonard — producer 
 Drew Lavyne — mastering engineer 
 Sean Moffit — mixing 
 Colby Wedgeworth — producer

Charts

Weekly charts

Year-end charts

Release history

References

External links
  on PraiseCharts

2019 singles
2019 songs
Cody Carnes songs
Songs written by Cody Carnes
Songs written by Matt Maher